Metarctia flavivena is a moth of the subfamily Arctiinae. It was described by George Hampson in 1901. It is found in Angola, the Democratic Republic of the Congo, Ethiopia, Kenya, Mozambique, Nigeria, Rwanda, Uganda and Zimbabwe.

References

 

Metarctia
Moths described in 1901
Moths of Sub-Saharan Africa